When Spicy Meets Sweet is an interstitial reality television program produced by MTV and Doritos. The micro-series premiered on April 18, 2008 between 2pm—5pm ET/PT during MTV's Friday programming block, now dubbed "Spicy Sweet Fridays."

Plot
The 18-episode reality-dating series began airing on April 18, 2008 when fans saw what happened as spicy girls and sweet guys were matched up to go
on dates. Throughout the short-form series, cast members took on some of
the most unpredictable dating experiences of their lives, all captured on
film and watched by millions. Viewers saw their chosen sweet guys go on
spicy dates such as a trip to the tattoo and piercing parlor, while their
chosen spicy girls explored their sweeter side on dates such as
volunteering at a senior citizens center. At the ending of the dates, there was an elimination process, leaving only one date for each.

Cast
Amara Cash (Hollywood, California)- Spicy
Ryan Holden (Manhattan Beach, California)- Sweet
TJ Beaverson (New Cumberland, Pennsylvania)- Sweet
Brendan Jennings (Carrier Mills, Illinois)-Sweet
Brian Morris (Peachtree City, Georgia)- Sweet
Drew Cook (Jay, Florida)- Sweet
Sarah Barker (Las Vegas, Nevada- Spicy
Jillian Conshohocken, Pennsylvania)- Spicy
Kristen (Warwick, Rhode Island)- Spicy
Louisa Torres (Orlando, Florida)- Spicy

Doritos, MTV affiliation
In February 2008, Doritos and MTV invited fans across the country to submit their profile on Doritos' website snackstrongproductions.com for a chance to be cast on the new reality dating series. To support this program, MTV re-branded its web site www.nextornot.com to spicyandsweet.nextornot.com to be as an interactive community for hopefuls to submit their profiles. Between February 25 and March 16, online viewers helped to determine the four "spicy" girls and four "sweet" guys to be cast in the show by the amount of time spent on their favorite profiles. The web site has garnered more than 19 million page views, with users averaging more than 30 minutes on the site for one visit. In 2007 Doritos aired two consumer-created commercials during Super Bowl XLI as part the "Crash the Super Bowl challenge".

NextOrNot.com
MTV debuted NextOrNot.com, the online companion to the series, in October 2007. Inspired in equal part by ratings sites such as HotOrNot.com and online social networks like Facebook, Nextornot.com allows users to browse through a library of user profiles featuring prominent pictures and personal information. Time spent by site users looking at each profile is logged, and at the end of each day the user whose profile has received the highest cumulative viewing time appears on MTV as the "Hottie of the Day."

External links
 Official site
 Doritos
 Snack Strong Productions

References

American dating and relationship reality television series
MTV original programming
MTV game shows
2000s American reality television series
2008 American television series debuts
Interstitial television shows
2008 American television series endings